The GM-NAA I/O input/output system of General Motors and North American Aviation was the first operating system for the IBM 704 computer.

It was created in 1956 by Robert L. Patrick of General Motors Research and Owen Mock of North American Aviation. It was based on a system monitor created in 1955 by programmers of General Motors for its IBM 701.

The main function of GM-NAA I/O was to automatically execute a new program once the one that was being executed had finished (batch processing).  It was formed of shared routines to the programs that provided common access to the input/output devices. Some version of the system was used in about forty 704 installations.

See also
SHARE Operating System, an operating system based on GM-NAA I/O.
Multiple Console Time Sharing System
Timeline of operating systems
Resident monitor

References

External links
 Operating Systems at Conception by Robert L. Patrick
 The World’s First Computer Operating System in millosh's blog talks about the General Motors OS and GM-NAA I/O

IBM mainframe operating systems
Discontinued operating systems
1956 software
Computer-related introductions in 1956
History of computing